The Queens Theatre was a theatre in Glasgow, Scotland, situated in Watson Street near Glasgow Cross. It was built in the 1870s to cater for working class Glaswegians. The theatre opened as the Star Hall. It went on to be renamed the Shakespeare Music Hall, New Star Theatre of Varieties and the Peoples Palace Theatre before being named the Queens Theatre in 1897. The theatre was destroyed by fire in 1952.

References

Former theatres in Scotland
Theatres in Glasgow